Nueva Camarines is a proposed province of the Philippines to be created out of Camarines Sur in the Bicol Region of the island of Luzon. The proposed province would border Camarines Sur to the west, the Philippine Sea to the north, Albay to the south, and to the east the island province of Catanduanes across Maqueda Channel. Its capital is expected to be Tigaon if the bill is passed.

House Bill 4820, which could have created the province passed the House of Representatives of the Philippines with 229 votes in favor to one against in 2011. However, at the end of 15th Congress, it failed to pass to the Senate, and was never ratified. In the 16th Congress under the former Representative Felix William Fuentebella, a bill was filed to repropose the creation of the province, but due to the lack of support from former Camarines Sur Representatives Maria Leonor Robredo and Salvio Fortuno, the proposal failed as well. Another bill was filed in the 18th Congress and 19th Congress under Representative Arnulf Bryan Fuentebella.

The bill was originally introduced by Congressman Arnulfo Fuentebella who currently represents the area of the new province in the House of Representatives and co-authored by fellow Camarines Sur Congressmen Rolando Andaya Jr., Diosdado Ignacio Arroyo and Luis Villafuerte, but is opposed by the Camarines Sur Governor Luis Raymond Villafuerte, and Representative Salvio Fortuno.

The proposed province would be created in the Partido region, where the Partido Development Administration is active.

Proposed territory  
Baao
Balatan 
Bato
Buhi 
Bula
Caramoan
Garchitorena 
Goa 
Iriga City
Lagonoy 
Nabua 
Presentacion 
Sagñay 
San Jose 
Siruma 
Tigaon (proposed capital) 
Tinambac

References

Proposed provinces and territories of the Philippines
Bicol Region